Dutch (released as Driving Me Crazy outside the US) is a 1991 American road comedy-drama film directed by Peter Faiman (his second and last theatrical film, after "Crocodile" Dundee) and written by John Hughes. The film stars Ed O'Neill (in the title role) and Ethan Embry, co-starring JoBeth Williams, Christopher McDonald, Ari Meyers, and E. G. Daily. The original music score was composed by Alan Silvestri.

The film was poorly received critically and was a box office bomb, although it gained a minor cult following after its home video release. O'Neill and Embry would later reunite as Joe Friday and Frank Smith in the 2003 version of the television series Dragnet.

Plot
Dutch Dooley attends a ritzy party with his girlfriend, Natalie Standish. He stands out terribly among the upper-class aristocrats – wearing a cheap suit and making boorish comments. Natalie's relaxed, less rigid personality also does not fit with the rest of the patrons. Dutch also meets Natalie's snobbish, wealthy ex-husband Reed, who tells Natalie that he will have to break his Thanksgiving plans with their son Doyle for an unexpected business trip to London, and that Natalie will have to tell Doyle.

Natalie calls Doyle at his private school in Georgia and invites him home for Thanksgiving, but Doyle refuses the offer, solely blaming his mother for the divorce. Despite this, Dutch sees an opportunity to get to know Doyle and further his relationship with Natalie, so he offers to go to Georgia and bring Doyle back to Chicago for the holidays.

Upon arriving in Georgia, Dutch finds Doyle to be much like his father: snobbish, selfish and elitist. He welcomes Dutch by throwing a book at his face, hitting him with a golf club, kicking him and shooting him in the groin with a BB gun, for which Dutch promises revenge. Dutch ultimately hogties Doyle to a hockey stick and carries him to the car to start on the drive back home.

The pair endures several mishaps, including an impromptu fireworks show that sees Dutch's coat destroyed. Later, after Doyle throws a lit cigar in Dutch's lap, Dutch throws Doyle out of the car and makes him walk to the next motel by himself. Doyle gets even by parking Dutch's car in the middle of the highway, where it is hit and totaled by a truck. They hitch a ride with two prostitutes who steal their luggage and Dutch's wallet, leaving them stranded.

Doyle calls his father, whom he discovers has lied about his trip to London; he instead spent the holidays with a girlfriend. Stunned by his father's betrayal, and wounded by Dutch's accusation that he "hates his mother", Doyle begins to regret his callous attitude. Dutch initially gives up and wants to call Natalie for assistance, but Doyle refuses and insists on getting home on their own. They sneak a ride on the back of a semi-truck and are assaulted by security guards at a trailer drop yard; Doyle brandishes his BB gun and feigns insanity, pretending that voices in his head are telling him to kill the guards, which frightens them enough to allow their escape.

The two enter a restaurant, where they meet a married couple who takes them to a homeless shelter in Hammond, Indiana for the night. At the shelter, Doyle grows fond of a young girl and her family. While getting to know them, he finally realizes that he has been neglecting his mother and indeed wants to be with her for the holidays. It is also eventually revealed that Dutch is a successful contractor and, while not as ostentatious, he is just as wealthy as Reed and his snobbish crowd.

On Thanksgiving day, the family drives Dutch and Doyle to Natalie's home, where Reed is waiting. Doyle reunites with his mother and reveals to Reed that he knows the truth about his trip to London. When Doyle decides to stay with his mother instead of Reed for Thanksgiving, Reed evicts Natalie from the house, which he owns. Dutch follows Reed outside as he departs and hits Reed in the forehead with his pinky ring. He then demands that Reed show more respect to Natalie and become a better father to Doyle, to which a dazed Reed agrees.

As Natalie, Dutch and Doyle sit down to begin their Thanksgiving feast, Dutch asks Doyle to retrieve Dutch's coat, as it contains a very special gift for Natalie. As Doyle walks away, Dutch pulls the BB gun Doyle originally shot him with and finally gets his revenge by shooting him in the groin.

Cast
 Ed O'Neill as Dutch Dooley
 Ethan Embry as Doyle Standish (as Ethan Randall)
 JoBeth Williams as Natalie Standish
 Christopher McDonald as Reed Standish
 E. G. Daily as Hailey
 Ari Meyers as Brock
 L. Scott Caldwell as Homeless Woman
 Kathleen Freeman as Gritzi

Reception

Critical
Dutch received poor reviews from critics. It holds a 17% approval rating on Rotten Tomatoes from 23 reviews, with an average rating of 3.7/10. Audiences polled by CinemaScore gave the film an average grade of "B+" on an A+ to F scale. Critic Roger Ebert, in his one-and-a-half star review of the film, thought that Dutch'''s screenwriter Hughes was following his own formula, repeating some of his other films, such as Planes, Trains and Automobiles'' (1987), and cited O'Neill's character as behaving "in defiance of common sense."

Box office
The film opened at #10 at the box office and grossed $1,867,201. The film would end with a domestic gross of $4,603,929. It was a box office bomb, grossing less than $5 million domestically against its $17 million budget.

Accolades

|-
|rowspan="2"| 1992
| Best Young Actor Starring in a Motion Picture - Ethan Embry
| Young Artist Award
| 
|-
| Best Family Motion Picture - Comedy
| Young Artist Award
|

Home media
The film was released on DVD on March 22, 2005, and also was released on Blu-ray on January 17, 2012.

References

External links

 
 
 

1990s road comedy-drama films
1991 films
20th Century Fox films
American road comedy-drama films
1990s English-language films
Films directed by Peter Faiman
Films scored by Alan Silvestri
Films set in Chicago
Films set in Georgia (U.S. state)
Films with screenplays by John Hughes (filmmaker)
Thanksgiving in films
1991 comedy films
1991 drama films
1990s American films